Microlestes is a genus of ground beetle native to the Afro-tropical region, the Palearctic (including Europe), the Near East, North Africa, and the Oriental region. It contains the following species:

 Microlestes abeillei (Brisout, 1885) 
 Microlestes abellei Brisout Da Barneville, 1885 
 Microlestes aditi Mateu, 1979 
 Microlestes aenigmaticus Mateu, 1963 
 Microlestes afer Mateu, 1963 
 Microlestes africanus Mateu, 1959 
 Microlestes aljezurensis Ortuño & Oliveira, 2012
 Microlestes andrewesi Mateu, 1979 
 Microlestes angusteforcipatus Antoine, 1941 
 Microlestes ankaratrae Jeannel, 1949 
 Microlestes annamensis (Bates, 1889)  
 Microlestes apterus Holdhaus, 1904 
 Microlestes asiaticus Mateu, 1971 
 Microlestes australis Mateu, 1963 
 Microlestes bacchusi Mateu, 1979 
 Microlestes badulini Komarov, 1989 
 Microlestes balli Mateu, 1974 
 Microlestes basilewskyi Mateu, 1963 
 Microlestes baudii Fairmaire, 1892 
 Microlestes bipunctatus Mateu, 1963 
 Microlestes birmanicus Mateu, 1959 
 Microlestes bomansi Mateu, 1963 
 Microlestes brahma Mateu, 1960 
 Microlestes brevilobus Lindroth, 1969 
 Microlestes brunneus Mateu, 1963 
 Microlestes capensis (Motschulsky, 1864)  
 Microlestes castaneus Mateu, 1963 
 Microlestes celebensis Mateu, 1959 
 Microlestes coiffaiti Mateu, 1956 
 Microlestes collarti Mateu, 1963 
 Microlestes conspicuus Mateu, 1963 
 Microlestes corticalis L. Dufour, 1820 
 Microlestes creticus Holdhaus, 1912 
 Microlestes curtatus Darlington, 1968 
 Microlestes curtipennis (Casey, 1920) 
 Microlestes decellei Mateu, 1968 
 Microlestes demessus Andrewes, 1923 
 Microlestes dentatus Mateu, 1963 
 Microlestes discoidalis Fairmaire, 1892 
 Microlestes espanoli Jeanne, 1985
 Microlestes exilis Schmidt-Goebel, 1846 
 Microlestes fissuralis Reitter, 1901 
 Microlestes flavipes Motschulsky, 1859 
 Microlestes freyi Mateu, 1963 
 Microlestes fulvibasis Reitter, 1901
 Microlestes fulvus Alfieri, 1976 
 Microlestes gallicus Holdhaus, 1912 
 Microlestes gharuhanus Mateu, 1976 
 Microlestes glabrellus Reitter, 1901 
 Microlestes golvani Mateu, 1961 
 Microlestes gomerensis Harold Lindberg, 1953 
 Microlestes gracilicornis Holdhaus, 1912 
 Microlestes grandis Mateu, 1963 
 Microlestes halffteri Mateu, 1974  
 Microlestes haranti Verdien, Quezel & Rioux, 1951 
 Microlestes holdhausi Gridelli, 1930 
 Microlestes ibericus Holdhaus, 1912 
 Microlestes ignotus Mateu, 1971 
 Microlestes imaii Habu, 1972 
 Microlestes inconspicuus Schmidt-Goebel, 1846 
 Microlestes indicus Mateu, 1959 
 Microlestes infuscatus Motschulsky, 1859 
 Microlestes iranicus Mateu, 1984 
 Microlestes irregularis Mateu, 1963 
 Microlestes kali Mateu, 1960 
 Microlestes kochi Mateu, 1963 
 Microlestes leleupi Mateu, 1963 
 Microlestes levipennis Lucas, 1846 
 Microlestes lindrothi Mateu, 1995 
 Microlestes linearis (Leconte, 1851) 
 Microlestes lucidus (Leconte, 1851) 
 Microlestes luctuosus Holdhaus, 1904 
 Microlestes luridus Mateu, 1959 
 Microlestes madecassus Alluaud, 1935 
 Microlestes maindroni Mateu, 1959 
 Microlestes major Lindroth, 1969 
 Microlestes maruta Mateu, 1979 
 Microlestes mauritanicus Lucas, 1846 
 Microlestes maurus Sturm, 1827 
 Microlestes mayidiensis Mateu, 1963 
 Microlestes mena Mateu, 1979 
 Microlestes minor Mateu, 1960 
 Microlestes minutulus (Goeze, 1777) 
 Microlestes mirei Mateu, 1953 
 Microlestes monodi Mateu, 1963 
 Microlestes monstruosus Mateu, 1963 
 Microlestes montanellus Mateu, 1971 
 Microlestes naini Jedlicka, 1964 
 Microlestes nanus Mateu, 1953 
 Microlestes negrei Mateu, 1959 
 Microlestes negrita Wollaston, 1854 
 Microlestes nigrinus (Mannerheim, 1843) 
 Microlestes nilgiricus Mateu, 1979 
 Microlestes notabilis Mateu, 1963 
 Microlestes numidicus Normand, 1941 
 Microlestes oberthueri Mateu, 1959 
 Microlestes orientalis Mateu, 1956 
 Microlestes parvati Mateu, 1971 
 Microlestes pauliani Mateu, 1963 
 Microlestes persicus Holdhaus, 1912 
 Microlestes phenax Antoine, 1941 
 Microlestes plagiatus Duftschmid, 1812 
 Microlestes poeyi Jacquelin Du Val, 1857 
 Microlestes politulus Reitter, 1901 
 Microlestes pusio (Leconte, 1863) 
 Microlestes rama Mateu, 1971 
 Microlestes reitteri Holdhaus, 1912 
 Microlestes repandus Mateu, 1960 
 Microlestes royi Mateu, 1963 
 Microlestes rudebecki Mateu, 1963 
 Microlestes sahelianus Mateu, 1959 
 Microlestes sahlbergi Holdhaus, 1912 
 Microlestes saigonicus Mateu, 1959 
 Microlestes schroederi Holdhaus, 1912 
 Microlestes seladon Holdhaus, 1912 
 Microlestes sinaiticus Alfieri, 1976 
 Microlestes siva Mateu, 1959 
 Microlestes solidus Mateu, 1960 
 Microlestes syriacus Brisout De Baneville, 1885  
 Microlestes tehuantepec Mateu, 1974 
 Microlestes tenuis Mateu, 1984 
 Microlestes testaceus Mateu, 1959 
 Microlestes theodoridesi Mateu, 1961 
 Microlestes villiersi Mateu, 1959 
 Microlestes vittatus Motschulsky, 1859 
 Microlestes vittipennis J.R. Sahlberg, 1908 
 Microlestes xanthopus (Bates, 1886) 
 Microlestes yunnanicus Mateu, 1961 
 Microlestes zambezianus Mateu, 1960

References

External links
Microlestes at Fauna Europaea

Lebiinae